Daniel Gimeno-Traver was the defending champion, but chose not to defend his title.

Seeds

Draw

Finals

Top half

Bottom half

References
 Main Draw
 Qualifying Draw

Morocco Tennis Tour - Kenitra - Singles
2015 Singles
Tennis Tour - Kenitra - Singles